Jason Oakes (born 7 April 1995) is a South African cricketer. He was included in the KwaZulu-Natal cricket team squad for the 2015 Africa T20 Cup. In September 2019, he was named in KwaZulu-Natal's squad for the 2019–20 CSA Provincial T20 Cup. In April 2021, he was named in North West's squad, ahead of the 2021–22 cricket season in South Africa.

References

External links
 

1995 births
Living people
South African cricketers
KwaZulu-Natal cricketers
Cricketers from Pretoria
Wicket-keepers